The 2004 Arena Football League season was the 18th season of the Arena Football League. It was succeeded by 2005. The league champions were the San Jose SaberCats, who defeated the Arizona Rattlers in ArenaBowl XVIII. The AFL reduced its playoff teams from the top 12 teams in the league making the playoffs to the top eight teams in the league making the playoffs.

Standings

 Green indicates clinched playoff berth
 Purple indicates division champion
 Grey indicates best regular season record

* New York Dragons won the Eastern Division, but did not make the playoffs as only the top 8 teams qualified. The AFL reverted to the old rule in the following season in  that Division Champions get an automatic bid to the playoffs for the following season.

Playoffs
All games televised by NBC

All-Arena team

References